The Panchatantra (IAST: Pañcatantra, ISO: Pañcatantra, "Five Treatises") is an ancient Indian collection of interrelated animal fables in Sanskrit verse and prose, arranged within a frame story. The surviving work is dated to about 200 BCE, but the fables are likely much more ancient. The text's author is unknown, but it has been attributed to Vishnu Sharma in some recensions and Vasubhaga in others, both of which may be fictitious pen names. It is likely a Hindu text, and based on older oral traditions with "animal fables that are as old as we are able to imagine".

It is "certainly the most frequently translated literary product of India", and these stories are among the most widely known in the world. It goes by many names in many cultures. There is a version of Panchatantra in nearly every major language of India, and in addition there are 200 versions of the text in more than 50 languages around the world. One version reached Europe in the 11th century. To quote :

The earliest known translation into a non-Indian language is in Middle Persian (Pahlavi, 550 CE) by Burzoe. This became the basis for a Syriac translation as Kalilag and Damnag and a translation into Arabic in 750 CE by Persian scholar Abdullah Ibn al-Muqaffa as Kalīlah wa Dimnah. A New Persian version by Rudaki, from the 3rd century Hijri, became known as Kalīleh o Demneh. Rendered in prose by Abu'l-Ma'ali Nasrallah Monshi in 1143 CE, this was the basis of Kashefi's 15th-century Anvār-i Suhaylī (The Lights of Canopus), which in turn was translated into Humayun-namah in Turkish. The book is also known as The Fables of Bidpai (or Pilpai in various European languages, Vidyapati in Sanskrit) or The Morall Philosophie of Doni (English, 1570). Most European versions of the text are derivative works of the 12th-century Hebrew version of Panchatantra by Rabbi Joel. In Germany, its translation in 1480 by  has been widely read. Several versions of the text are also found in Indonesia, where it is titled as Tantri Kamandaka, Tantravakya or Candapingala and consists of 360 fables. In Laos, a version is called Nandaka-prakarana, while in Thailand it has been referred to as Nang Tantrai.

Author and chronology
The prelude section of the Panchatantra identifies an octogenarian Brahmin named Vishnusharma (IAST: Viṣṇuśarman) as its author. He is stated to be teaching the principles of good government to three princes of Amarasakti. It is unclear, states Patrick Olivelle, a professor of Sanskrit and Indian religions, if Vishnusharma was a real person or himself a literary invention. Some South Indian recensions of the text, as well as Southeast Asian versions of Panchatantra attribute the text to Vasubhaga, states Olivelle. Based on the content and mention of the same name in other texts dated to ancient and medieval era centuries, most scholars agree that Vishnusharma is a fictitious name. Olivelle and other scholars state that regardless of who the author was, it is likely "the author was a Hindu, and not a Buddhist, nor Jain", but it is unlikely that the author was a devotee of Hindu god Vishnu because the text neither expresses any sentiments against other Hindu deities such as Shiva, Indra and others, nor does it avoid invoking them with reverence.

Various locations where the text was composed have been proposed but this has been controversial. Some of the proposed locations include Kashmir, Southwestern or South India. The text's original language was likely Sanskrit. Though the text is now known as Panchatantra, the title found in old manuscript versions varies regionally, and includes names such as Tantrakhyayika, Panchakhyanaka, Panchakhyana and Tantropakhyana. The suffix akhyayika and akhyanaka mean "little story" or "little story book" in Sanskrit.

The text was translated into Pahlavi in 550 CE, which forms the latest limit of the text's existence. The earliest limit is uncertain. It quotes identical verses from Arthasastra, which is broadly accepted to have been completed by the early centuries of the common era. According to Olivelle, "the current scholarly consensus places the Panchatantra around 300 CE, although we should remind ourselves that this is only an educated guess". The text quotes from older genre of Indian literature, and legends with anthropomorphic animals are found in more ancient texts dated to the early centuries of the 1st millennium BCE such as the chapter 4.1 of the Chandogya Upanishad. According to Gillian Adams, Panchatantra may be a product of the Vedic period, but its age cannot be ascertained with confidence because "the original Sanskrit version has been lost".

Content

The Panchatantra is a series of inter-woven fables, many of which deploy metaphors of anthropomorphized animals with human virtues and vices. Its narrative illustrates, for the benefit of three ignorant princes, the central Hindu principles of nīti. While nīti is hard to translate, it roughly means prudent worldly conduct, or "the wise conduct of life".

Apart from a short introduction, it consists of five parts. Each part contains a main story, called the frame story, which in turn contains several embedded stories, as one character narrates a story to another. Often these stories contain further embedded stories. The stories operate like a succession of Russian dolls, one narrative opening within another, sometimes three or four deep. Besides the stories, the characters also quote various epigrammatic verses to make their point.

The five books have their own subtitles.

Book 1: Mitra-bheda

The first treatise features a jackal named Damanaka, as the unemployed minister in a kingdom ruled by a lion. He, along with his moralizing sidekick named Karataka, conspire to break up alliances and friendships of the lion king. A series of fables describe the conspiracies and causes that lead to close and inseparable friends breaking up.

The Book 1 contains over thirty fables, with the version Arthur Ryder translated containing 34: The Loss of Friends, The Wedge-Pulling Monkey, The Jackal and the War-Drum, Merchant Strong-Tooth, Godly and June, The Jackal at the Ram-Fight, The Weaver's Wife, How the Crow-Hen Killed the Black Snake, The Heron that Liked Crab-Meat, Numskull and the Rabbit, The Weaver Who Loved a Princess, The Ungrateful Man, Leap and Creep, The Blue Jackal, Passion and the Owl, Ugly's Trust Abused, The Lion and the Carpenter, The Plover Who Fought the Ocean, Shell-Neck Slim and Grim, Forethought Readywit and Fatalist, The Duel Between Elephant and Sparrow, The Shrewd Old Gander, The Lion and the Ram, Smart the Jackal, The Monk Who Left His Body Behind, The Girl Who Married a Snake, Poor Blossom, The Unteachable Monkey, Right-Mind and Wrong-Mind, A Remedy Worse than the Disease, The Mice That Ate Iron, The Results of Education, The Sensible Enemy, The Foolish Friend.

It is the longest of the five books, making up roughly 45% of the work's length.

Book 2: Mitra-samprāpti
The second treatise is quite different in structure than the remaining books, states Olivelle, as it does not truly embed fables. It is a collection of adventures of four characters: a crow (scavenger, not a predator, airborne habits), a mouse (tiny, underground habits), a turtle (slow, water habits) and a deer (a grazing animal viewed by other animals as prey, land habits). The overall focus of the book is the reverse of the first book. Its theme is to emphasize the importance of friendships, team work, and alliances. It teaches, "weak animals with very different skills, working together can accomplish what they cannot when they work alone", according to Olivelle. United through their cooperation and in their mutual support, the fables describe how they are able to outwit all external threats and prosper.

The second book contains ten fables: The Winning of Friends, The Bharunda Birds, Gold's Gloom, Mother Shandilee's Bargain, Self-defeating Forethought, Mister Duly, Soft, the Weaver, Hang-Ball and Greedy, The Mice That Set Elephant Free, Spot's Captivity.

Book 2 makes up about 22% of the total length.

Book 3: Kākolūkīyam

The third treatise discusses war and peace, presenting through animal characters a moral about the battle of wits being a strategic means to neutralize a vastly superior opponent's army. The thesis in this treatise is that a battle of wits is a more potent force than a battle of swords. The choice of animals embeds a metaphor of a war between good versus evil, and light versus darkness. Crows are good, weaker and smaller in number and are creatures of the day (light), while owls are presented as evil, numerous and stronger creatures of the night (darkness). The crow king listens to the witty and wise counsel of Ciramjivin, while the owl king ignores the counsel of Raktaksa. The good crows win.

The fables in the third book, as well as others, do not strictly limit to matters of war and peace. Some present fables that demonstrate how different characters have different needs and motives, which is subjectively rational from each character's viewpoint, and that addressing these needs can empower peaceful relationships even if they start off in a different way. For example, in the fable The Old Man the Young Wife, the text relates a story wherein an old man marries a young woman from a penniless family. The young woman detests his appearance so much that she refuses to even look at him let alone consummate their marriage. One night, while she sleeps in the same bed with her back facing the old man, a thief enters their house. She is scared, turns over, and for security embraces the man. This thrills every limb of the old man. He feels grateful to the thief for making his young wife hold him at last. The aged man rises and profusely thanks the thief, requesting the intruder to take whatever he desires.

The third book contains eighteen fables in Ryder translation: Crows and Owls, How the Birds Picked a King, How the Rabbit Fooled the Elephant, The Cat's Judgment, The Brahmin's Goat, The Snake and the Ants, The Snake Who Paid Cash, The Unsocial Swans, The Self-sacrificing Dove, The Old Man with the Young Wife, The Brahmin, the Thief and the Ghost, The Snake in the Prince's Belly, The Gullible Carpenter, Mouse-Maid Made Mouse, The Bird with Golden Dung, The Cave That Talked, The Frog That Rode Snakeback, The Butter-blinded Brahmin.

This is about 26% of the total length.

Book 4: Labdh
The book four of the Panchatantra is a simpler compilation of ancient moral-filled fables. These, states Olivelle, teach messages such as "a bird in hand is worth two in the bush". They caution the reader to avoid succumbing to peer pressure and cunning intent wrapped in soothing words. The book is different from the first three, in that the earlier books give positive examples of ethical behavior offering examples and actions "to do". In contrast, book four presents negative examples with consequences, offering examples and actions "to avoid, to watch out for".

The fourth book contains thirteen fables in Ryder translation: Loss of Gains, The Monkey and the Crocodile, Handsome and Theodore, Flop-Ear and Dusty, The Potter Militant, The Jackal Who Killed No Elephants, The Ungrateful Wife, King Joy and Secretary Splendor, The Ass in the Tiger-Skin, The Farmer's Wife, The Pert Hen-Sparrow, How Supersmart Ate the Elephant, The Dog Who Went Abroad.

Book 4, along with Book 5, is very short. Together the last two books constitute about 7% of the total text.

Book 5: Aparīkṣitakārakaṃ

Book five of the text is, like book four, a simpler compilation of moral-filled fables. These also present negative examples with consequences, offering examples and actions for the reader to ponder, avoid, and watch out for. The lessons in this last book include "get facts, be patient, don't act in haste then regret later", "don't build castles in the air". The book five is also unusual in that almost all its characters are humans, unlike the first four where the characters are predominantly anthropomorphized animals. According to Olivelle, it may be that the text's ancient author sought to bring the reader out of the fantasy world of talking and pondering animals into the realities of the human world.

The fifth book contains twelve fables about hasty actions or jumping to conclusions without establishing facts and proper due diligence. In Ryder translation, they are: Ill-considered Action, The Loyal Mongoose, The Four Treasure-Seekers, The Lion-Makers, Hundred-Wit Thousand-Wit and Single-Wit, The Musical Donkey, Slow the Weaver, The Brahman's Dream, The Unforgiving Monkey, The Credulous Fiend, The Three-Breasted Princess, The Fiend Who Washed His Feet.

One of the fables in this book is the story of a woman and a mongoose. She leaves her child with a mongoose friend. When she returns, she sees blood on the mongoose's mouth, and kills the friend, believing the animal killed her child. The woman discovers her child alive, and learns that the blood on the mongoose mouth came from it biting the snake while defending her child from the snake's attack. She regrets having killed the friend because of her hasty action.

Links with other fables
The fables of Panchatantra are found in numerous world languages. It is also considered partly the origin of European secondary works, such as folk tale motifs found in Boccaccio, La Fontaine and the works of Grimm Brothers. For a while, this had led to the hypothesis that popular worldwide animal-based fables had origins in India and the Middle East. According to Max Muller,

This monocausal hypothesis has now been generally discarded in favor of polygenetic hypothesis which states that fable motifs had independent origins in many ancient human cultures, some of which have common roots and some influenced by co-sharing of fables. The shared fables implied morals that appealed to communities separated by large distances and these fables were therefore retained, transmitted over human generations with local variations. However, many post-medieval era authors explicitly credit their inspirations to texts such as "Bidpai" and "Pilpay, the Indian sage" that are known to be based on the Panchatantra.

According to Niklas Bengtsson, even though India being the exclusive original source of fables is no longer taken seriously, the ancient classic Panchatantra, "which new folklore research continues to illuminate, was certainly the first work ever written down for children, and this in itself means that the Indian influence has been enormous [on world literature], not only on the genres of fables and fairy tales, but on those genres as taken up in children's literature". According to Adams and Bottigheimer, the fables of Panchatantra are known in at least 38 languages around the world in 112 versions by Jacob's old estimate, and its relationship with Mesopotamian and Greek fables is hotly debated in part because the original manuscripts of all three ancient texts have not survived. Olivelle states that there are 200 versions of the text in more than 50 languages around the world, in addition to a version in nearly every major language of India.

Scholars have noted the strong similarity between a few of the stories in The Panchatantra and Aesop's Fables. Examples are The Ass in the Panther's Skin and The Ass without Heart and Ears. The Broken Pot is similar to Aesop's The Milkmaid and Her Pail, The Gold-Giving Snake is similar to Aesop's The Man and the Serpent and Le Paysan et Dame serpent by Marie de France (Fables) Other well-known stories include The Tortoise and The Geese and The Tiger, the Brahmin and the Jackal. Similar animal fables are found in most cultures of the world, although some folklorists view India as the prime source. The Panchatantra has been a source of the world's fable literature.

The French fabulist Jean de La Fontaine acknowledged his indebtedness to the work in the introduction to his Second Fables:
"This is a second book of fables that I present to the public... I have to acknowledge that the greatest part is inspired from Pilpay, an Indian Sage".

The Panchatantra is the origin also of several stories in Arabian Nights, Sindbad, and of many Western nursery rhymes and ballads.

Origins and function

Nīti can be roughly translated as "the wise conduct of life" and a śāstra is a technical or scientific treatise; thus it is considered a treatise on political science and human conduct. Its literary sources are "the expert tradition of political science and the folk and literary traditions of storytelling". It draws from the Dharma and Artha śāstras, quoting them extensively. It is also explained that nīti "represents an admirable attempt to answer the insistent question how to win the utmost possible joy from life in the world of men" and that nīti is "the harmonious development of the powers of man, a life in which security, prosperity, resolute action, friendship, and good learning are so combined to produce joy".

The Panchatantra shares many stories in common with the Buddhist Jataka tales, purportedly told by the historical Buddha before his death around 400 BCE. As the scholar Patrick Olivelle writes, "It is clear that the Buddhists did not invent the stories. [...] It is quite uncertain whether the author of [the Panchatantra] borrowed his stories from the Jātakas or the Mahābhārata, or whether he was tapping into a common treasury of tales, both oral and literary, of ancient India." Many scholars believe the tales were based on earlier oral folk traditions, which were finally written down, although there is no conclusive evidence. In the early 20th century, W. Norman Brown found that many folk tales in India appeared to be borrowed from literary sources and not vice versa.

An early Western scholar who studied The Panchatantra was Dr. Johannes Hertel, who thought the book had a Machiavellian character. Similarly, Edgerton noted that "the so-called 'morals' of the stories have no bearing on morality; they are unmoral, and often immoral. They glorify shrewdness and practical wisdom, in the affairs of life, and especially of politics, of government." Other scholars dismiss this assessment as one-sided, and view the stories as teaching , or proper moral conduct. Also:

According to Olivelle, "Indeed, the current scholarly debate regarding the intent and purpose of the 'Pañcatantra' — whether it supports unscrupulous Machiavellian politics or demands ethical conduct from those holding high office — underscores the rich ambiguity of the text". Konrad Meisig states that the Panchatantra has been incorrectly represented by some as "an entertaining textbook for the education of princes in the Machiavellian rules of Arthasastra", but instead it is a book for the "Little Man" to develop "Niti" (social ethics, prudent behavior, shrewdness) in their pursuit of Artha, and a work on social satire. According to Joseph Jacobs, "... if one thinks of it, the very raison d'être of the Fable is to imply its moral without mentioning it."

The Panchatantra, states Patrick Olivelle, tells wonderfully a collection of delightful stories with pithy proverbs, ageless and practical wisdom; one of its appeal and success is that it is a complex book that "does not reduce the complexities of human life, government policy, political strategies, and ethical dilemmas into simple solutions; it can and does speak to different readers at different levels." In the Indian tradition, the work is a Shastra genre of literature, more specifically a Nitishastra text.

The text has been a source of studies on political thought in Hinduism, as well as the management of Artha with a debate on virtues and vices.

Metaphors and layered meanings
The Sanskrit version of the Panchatantra text gives names to the animal characters, but these names are creative with double meanings. The names connote the character observable in nature but also map a human personality that a reader can readily identify. For example, the deer characters are presented as a metaphor for the charming, innocent, peaceful and tranquil personality who is a target for those who seek a prey to exploit, while the crocodile is presented to symbolize dangerous intent hidden beneath a welcoming ambiance (waters of a lotus flower-laden pond). Dozens of different types of wildlife found in India are thus named, and they constitute an array of symbolic characters in the Panchatantra. Thus, the names of the animals evoke layered meaning that resonates with the reader, and the same story can be read at different levels.

Cross-cultural migrations

The work has gone through many different versions and translations from the sixth century to the present day. The original Indian version was first translated into a foreign language (Pahlavi) by Borzūya in 570CE, then into Arabic in 750. This Arabic version was translated into several languages, including Syriac, Greek, Persian, Hebrew and Spanish, and thus became the source of versions in European languages, until the English translation by Charles Wilkins of the Sanskrit Hitopadesha in 1787.

Early cross-cultural migrations
The Panchatantra approximated its current literary form within the 4th–6th centuries CE, though originally written around 200 BCE. No Sanskrit texts before 1000 CE have survived. Buddhist monks on pilgrimage to India took the influential Sanskrit text (probably both in oral and literary formats) north to Tibet and China and east to South East Asia. These led to versions in all Southeast Asian countries, including Tibetan, Chinese, Mongolian, Javanese and Lao derivatives.

How Borzuy brought the work from India

The Panchatantra also migrated into the Middle East, through Iran, during the Sassanid reign of Anoushiravan. Around 550 CE his notable physician Borzuy (Burzuwaih) translated the work from Sanskrit into the Pahlavi (Middle Persian language). He transliterated the main characters as Karirak ud Damanak.

According to the story told in the Shāh Nāma (The Book of the Kings, Persia's late 10th-century national epic by Ferdowsi), Borzuy sought his king's permission to make a trip to Hindustan in search of a mountain herb he had read about that is "mingled into a compound and, when sprinkled over a corpse, it is immediately restored to life." He did not find the herb, but was told by a wise sage of "a different interpretation. The herb is the scientist; science is the mountain, everlastingly out of reach of the multitude. The corpse is the man without knowledge, for the uninstructed man is everywhere lifeless. Through knowledge man becomes revivified."

The sage pointed to the book, and the visiting physician Borzuy translated the work with the help of some Pandits (Brahmins). According to Hans Bakker, Borzuy visited the kingdom of Kannauj in north India during the 6th century in an era of intense exchange between Persian and Indian royal courts, and he secretly translated a copy of the text then sent it to the court of Anoushiravan in Persia, along with other cultural and technical knowledge.

Kalila wa Demna: Mid. Persian and Arabic versions

Borzuy's translation of the Sanskrit version into Pahlavi arrived in Persia by the 6th century, but this Middle Persian version is now lost. The book had become popular in Sassanid, and was translated into Syriac and Arabic whose copies survive. According to Riedel, "the three preserved New Persian translations originated between the 10th and 12th century", and are based on the 8th-century Arabic translation by Ibn al-Muqaffa of Borzuy's work on Panchatantra. It is the 8th-century Kalila wa Demna text, states Riedel, that has been the most influential of the known Arabic versions, not only in the Middle East, but also through its translations into Greek, Hebrew and Old Spanish.

The Persian Ibn al-Muqaffa' translated the Panchatantra (in ) from Middle Persian to Arabic as Kalīla wa Dimna. This is considered the first masterpiece of "Arabic literary prose."

The introduction of the first book of Kalila wa Demna is different from Panchatantra, in being more elaborate and instead of king and his three sons studying in the Indian version, the Persian version speaks of a merchant and his three sons who had squandered away their father's wealth. The Persian version also makes an abrupt switch from the story of the three sons to an injured ox, and thereafter parallels the Panchatantra.

The two jackals' names transmogrified into Kalila and Dimna in the Persian version. Perhaps because the first section constituted most of the work, or because translators could find no simple equivalent in Zoroastrian Pahlavi for the concept expressed by the Sanskrit word 'Panchatantra', the jackals' names, Kalila and Dimna, became the generic name for the entire work in classical times.

After the first chapter, Ibn al-Muqaffaʿ inserted a new one, telling of Dimna's trial. The jackal is suspected of instigating the death of the bull "Shanzabeh", a key character in the first chapter. The trial lasts for two days without conclusion, until a tiger and leopard appear to bear witness against Dimna. He is found guilty and put to death.

Ibn al-Muqaffa' inserted other additions and interpretations into his 750CE "re-telling" (see Francois de Blois' Burzōy's voyage to India and the origin of the book Kalīlah wa Dimnah).  The political theorist Jennifer London suggests that he was expressing risky political views in a metaphorical way. (Al-Muqaffa' was murdered within a few years of completing his manuscript). London has analysed how Ibn al-Muqaffa' could have used his version to make "frank political expression" at the 'Abbasid court (see J. London's "How To Do Things With Fables: Ibn al-Muqaffas Frank Speech in Stories from Kalila wa Dimna," History of Political Thought XXIX: 2 (2008)).

The Arabic classic by Ibn al-Muqaffa

Borzuy's 570 CE Pahlavi translation (Kalile va Demne, now lost) was translated into Syriac. Nearly two centuries later, it was translated into Arabic by Ibn al-Muqaffa around 750 CE under the Arabic title, Kalīla wa Dimna. After the Arab invasion of Persia (Iran), Ibn al-Muqaffa's version (two languages removed from the pre-Islamic Sanskrit original) emerged as the pivotal surviving text that enriched world literature. Ibn al-Muqaffa's work is considered a model of the finest Arabic prose style, and "is considered the first masterpiece of Arabic literary prose."

Some scholars believe that Ibn al-Muqaffa's translation of the second section, illustrating the Sanskrit principle of Mitra Laabha (Gaining Friends), became the unifying basis for the Brethren of Purity (Ikwhan al-Safa) — the anonymous 9th-century CE encyclopedists whose prodigious literary effort, Encyclopedia of the Brethren of Sincerity, codified Indian, Persian and Greek knowledge. A suggestion made by Goldziher, and later written on by Philip K. Hitti in his History of the Arabs, proposes that "The appellation is presumably taken from the story of the ringdove in Kalilah wa-Dimnah in which it is related that a group of animals by acting as faithful friends (ikhwan al-safa) to one another escaped the snares of the hunter." This story is mentioned as an exemplum when the Brethren speak of mutual aid in one risaala (treatise), a crucial part of their system of ethics.

Spread to the rest of Europe
Almost all pre-modern European translations of the Panchatantra arise from this Arabic version. From Arabic it was re-translated into Syriac in the 10th or 11th century, into Greek (as Stephanites and Ichnelates) in 1080 by the Jewish Byzantine doctor Simeon Seth, into 'modern' Persian by Abu'l-Ma'ali Nasrallah Munshi in 1121, and in 1252 into Spanish (old Castilian, Calila e Dimna).

Perhaps most importantly, it was translated into Hebrew by Rabbi Joel in the 12th century. This Hebrew version was translated into Latin by John of Capua as  Directorium Humanae Vitae, or "Directory of Human Life", and printed in 1480, and became the source of most European versions.
A German translation, Das Buch der Beispiele, of the Panchatantra was printed in 1483, making this one of the earliest books to be printed by Gutenberg's press after the Bible.

The Latin version was translated into Italian by Antonfrancesco Doni in 1552. This translation became the basis for the first English translation, in 1570: Sir Thomas North translated it into Elizabethan English as The Fables of Bidpai: The Morall Philosophie of Doni (reprinted by Joseph Jacobs, 1888). La Fontaine published The Fables of Bidpai in 1679, based on "the Indian sage Pilpay".

Modern era
It was the Panchatantra that served as the basis for the studies of Theodor Benfey, the pioneer in the field of comparative literature. Hertel discovered several recensions in India, in particular the oldest available Sanskrit recension, the Tantrakhyayika in Kashmir, and the so-called North Western Family Sanskrit text by the Jain monk Purnabhadra in 1199 CE that blends and rearranges at least three earlier versions. Edgerton undertook a minute study of all texts which seemed "to provide useful evidence on the lost Sanskrit text to which, it must be assumed, they all go back", and believed he had reconstructed the original Sanskrit Panchatantra; this version is known as the Southern Family text.

Among modern translations, Arthur W. Ryder's translation, translating prose for prose and verse for rhyming verse, remains popular. In the 1990s two English versions of the Panchatantra were published, Chandra Rajan's translation (like Ryder's, based on Purnabhadra's recension) by Penguin (1993), and Patrick Olivelle's translation (based on Edgerton's reconstruction of the ur-text) by Oxford University Press (1997). Olivelle's translation was republished in 2006 by the Clay Sanskrit Library.

Recently Ibn al-Muqaffa's historical milieu itself, when composing his masterpiece in Baghdad during the bloody Abbasid overthrow of the Umayyad dynasty, has become the subject (and rather confusingly, also the title) of a gritty Shakespearean drama by the multicultural Kuwaiti playwright Sulayman Al-Bassam. Ibn al-Muqqafa's biographical background serves as an illustrative metaphor for today's escalating bloodthirstiness in Iraq — once again a historical vortex for clashing civilisations on a multiplicity of levels, including the obvious tribal, religious and political parallels.

The novelist Doris Lessing notes in her introduction to Ramsay Wood's 1980 "retelling" of the first two of the five Panchatantra books, that

See also

 Arthashastra
 Calila e Dimna
 Hitopadesha
 Jataka tales
 Katha (storytelling format)
 Kathasaritsagara
 Mirrors for princes
 Wisdom literature
 One Thousand and One Nights

Notes

Editions and translations
(Ordered chronologically.)

Sanskrit texts
Critical editions
 . II and III, IV and V
 
 
 
 
 
  (reprinting in Devanagari only the text from his 1924 work)
Others
 , Google Books
  (Text with Sanskrit commentary)
  (Complete Sanskrit text with Hindi translation)

Translations in English
The Panchatantra
  (also republished in 1956, reprint 1964, and by Jaico Publishing House, Bombay, 1949). The Panchatantra, Columbia University archives; (Translation based on Hertel's text of Purnabhadra's Recension of 1199 CE.)
  (reprint: 1995) (Translation based on Hertel manuscript.)
  (Translation based on Edgerton manuscript.)
  (Accessible popular compilation derived from a Sanskrit text with reference to the aforementioned translations by Chandra Rajan and Patrick Olivelle.)
 

Kalila and Dimna, Fables of Bidpai and other texts
  Google BooksGoogle Books (translated from Silvestre de Stacy's 1816 collation of different Arabic manuscripts)
  Also online at Persian Literature in Translation
 
 , reprinted by Philo Press, Amsterdam 1970
  Google Books (edited and induced from The Morall Philosophie of Doni by Sir Thomas North, 1570)Tales Within Tales – adapted from the fables of Pilpai, Sir Arthur N Wollaston, John Murray, London 1909
 
 
 
 

Further reading

N. M. Penzer (1924), The Ocean of Story, Being C.H. Tawney's Translation of Somadeva's Katha Sarit Sagara (or Ocean of Streams of Story): Volume V (of X), Appendix I: pp. 207–242 also proofread with glossary
Ferial Ghazoul (1983), Poetic Logic in The Panchatantra and The Arabian Nights, Arab Studies Quarterly, Vol. 5, No. 1 (Winter 1983), pp. 13–21Burzoy's Voyage to India and the Origin of the Book of Kalilah wa Dimnah Google Books, Francois de Blois, Royal Asiatic Society, London, 1990On Kalila wa Dimna and Persian National Fairy Tales Transoxiana.com, Dr. Pavel Basharin [Moscow], Tansoxiana 12, 2007The Past We Share — The Near Eastern Ancestry of Western Folk Literature, E. L. Ranelagh, Quartet Books, Horizon Press, New York, 1979In Arabian Nights — A Search of Morocco through its Stories and Storytellers by Tahir Shah, Doubleday, 2008.
Ibn al-Muqaffa, Abdallah. Kalilah et Dimnah. Ed. P. Louis Cheiko. 3 ed. Beirut: Imprimerie Catholique, 1947.
Ibn al-Muqaffa, Abd'. Calila e Dimna. Edited by Juan Manuel Cacho Blecua and María Jesus Lacarra. Madrid: Editorial Castalia, 1984.
Keller, John Esten, and Robert White Linker. El libro de Calila e Digna. Madrid Consejo Superior de Investigaciones Cientificas, 1967.
Latham, J.D. "Ibn al-Muqaffa' and Early 'Abbasid Prose." '''Abbasid Belles-Lettres. Eds. Julia Ashtiany, et al. Cambridge: Cambridge UP, 1989. 48–77.
Parker, Margaret. The Didactic Structure and Content of El libro de Calila e Digna. Miami, FL: Ediciones Universal, 1978.
Penzol, Pedro. Las traducciones del "Calila e Dimna". Madrid,: Impr. de Ramona Velasco, viuda de P. Perez,, 1931.
Shaw, Sandra. The Jatakas — Birth Stories of the Bodhisatta, Penguin Classics, Penguin Books India, New Delhi, 2006
Wacks, David A. "The Performativity of Ibn al-Muqaffas Kalîla wa-Dimna and Al-Maqamat al-Luzumiyya of al-Saraqusti," Journal of Arabic Literature'' 34.1–2 (2003): 178–89.

External links
 
 
 
 
 

3rd-century BC books
Ancient Indian literature
Fables
History of literature
Indian folklore
Islamic mirrors for princes
Medieval Arabic literature
Oral tradition
Persian literature
Sanskrit texts
Storytelling
Treatises